is a mountain with an altitude of 1,247 m in the Suzuka Mountains in Higashiōmi, Shiga Prefecture. The northeastern side of the hillside is located on the border with Inabe, Mie Prefecture. It is the highest peak in the Suzuka Mountains and Higashiōmi.

References

Mountains of Shiga Prefecture
Four-thousanders of Asia